Lloyd Kenyon, 3rd Baron Kenyon (1 April 1805 – 14 July 1869), was a British peer and Member of Parliament.

Kenyon was the son of George Kenyon, 2nd Baron Kenyon, and Margaret Emma Hanmer. His grandfather was Lloyd Kenyon, 1st Baron Kenyon, Master of the Rolls and Lord Chief Justice of England. Kenyon was elected to the House of Commons for the rotten borough of St Michael's (also known as Mitchell) in 1830, a seat he held until 1832, when the constituency was disfranchised by the Reform Act 1832. In 1855 he succeeded his father as third Baron Kenyon and entered the House of Lords.

Lord Kenyon married Hon. Georgiana de Grey, daughter of Thomas de Grey, 4th Baron Walsingham, in 1833. He died in July 1869, aged 64, and was succeeded in his titles by his grandson Lloyd. His second son George Thomas Kenyon was MP for Denbigh Boroughs. Lady Kenyon died in 1874.

Notes

References
Kidd, Charles, Williamson, David (editors). Debrett's Peerage and Baronetage (1990 edition). New York: St Martin's Press, 1990,

External links 
 

1805 births
1869 deaths
Members of the Parliament of the United Kingdom for Mitchell
UK MPs 1830–1831
UK MPs 1831–1832
UK MPs who inherited peerages
Lloyd 3